Mohawk (formerly, Mohawk Valley) is an unincorporated community in Plumas County, California. It lies at an elevation of 4360 feet (1329 m).

The Mohawk Valley post office opened in 1870 and changed its name to Mohawk when it moved in 1881. The Mohawk post office closed in 1926.

References

Unincorporated communities in California
Unincorporated communities in Plumas County, California